The Dulgubnii are a Germanic tribe mentioned in Tacitus' Germania (Chapter 34) as living in what is today northwest Germany. Tacitus describes them being to the north of the Angrivarii and Chamavi, and as having moved from the north into the area once belonging to the Bructeri, between Ems, Lippe, and Weser. In this same area as the Dulgubnii, north of the Chamavi and Angrivarii, were the Chasuarii, and north of these, on the North Sea coast, where the Chauci. The Chasuarii's name is thought to derive from the River Hase which feeds into the middle of the Ems from the east, just northwest of the area associated with the Angrivarii, on the Weser. So from Tacitus, it appears that the Dulgubnii probably lived near the Weser. 

By the account of Tacitus, the Chauci in his time lived not only along the whole German coast, but would have also stretched down to the lands of the Cherusci and Chatti. So they were probably the neighbours of the Dulgubnii on the east.

The Dulgubnii in Tacitus are probably the same as Ptolemy's Doulgoumnioi of the same region (Book 2, Chapter 10). (Many Germanic names are corrupted in Ptolemy's Greek.) Ptolemy describes them near the Elbe, so to the east of the position described by Tacitus, in an area Tacitus associated with the Chauci. They are described as having the "Laccobardi" (Langobardi) to their north, and the "Suebi Angili" (Angles) to their south. To their east are the Angrivarii, still near the Weser, and then the "Chamae" (Chamavi), between Ems and Weser, north of the Bructeri who are now on the Rhine.

In Ptolemy, the Chamae, Angrivarii, and Laccobardi have the Chauci directly on their north, all the way to the coast, and stretched from Ems to Elbe. And the Dulgubnii are no longer between the Chauci and the Chamavi and Angrivarii. Compared to Tacitus, the Chasuarii had also moved away. Ptolemy mentions Casuari far to the south, east of the Abnoba mountains that run east of the Rhine (with the Tencteri apparently between Rhine and Abnoba at that point).

See also
List of Germanic peoples

Sources
 Tacitus, Germania, XXXIV.

Early Germanic peoples